Fideism is an epistemological theory which maintains that faith is independent of reason, or that reason and faith are hostile to each other and faith is superior at arriving at particular truths (see natural theology). The word fideism comes from fides, the Latin word for faith, and literally means "faith-ism". Philosophers have identified a number of different forms of fideism. Strict fideists hold that reason has no place in discovering theological truths, while moderate fideists hold that though some truth can be known by reason, faith stands above reason. Fideism is historically associated with some forms of Protestantism, but is rejected by the Catholic Church as heretical.

Theologians and philosophers have responded in various ways to the place of faith and reason in determining the truth of metaphysical ideas, morality, and religious beliefs. A fideist is one who argues for fideism. Historically, fideism is most commonly ascribed to four philosophers: Søren Kierkegaard, Blaise Pascal, William James, and Ludwig Wittgenstein; with fideism being a label applied in a negative sense by their opponents, but which is not always supported by their own ideas and works or followers. A qualified form of fideism is sometimes attributed to Immanuel Kant's famous suggestion that we must "deny knowledge in order to make room for faith".

Overview 
Alvin Plantinga defines "fideism" as "the exclusive or basic reliance upon faith alone, accompanied by a consequent disparagement of reason and utilized especially in the pursuit of philosophical or religious truth". The fideist therefore "urges reliance on faith rather than reason, in matters philosophical and religious", and therefore may go on to disparage the claims of reason.  The fideist seeks truth, above all: and affirms that reason cannot achieve certain kinds of truth, which must instead be accepted only by faith.

History

Theories of truth 

The doctrine of fideism is consistent with some, and radically contrary to other theories of truth:
 Correspondence theory of truth
 Pragmatic theory of truth
 Constructivist epistemology
 Consensus theory of truth
 Coherence theory of truth
 Subjectivism

Some forms of fideism outright reject the correspondence theory of truth, which has major philosophical implications. Some only claim a few religious details to be axiomatic.

Tertullian 

Tertullian taught fideistic concepts such as the later philosophers William of Ockham and Søren Kierkegaard. Tertullian's De Carne Christi (On the Flesh of Christ]) says "the Son of God died; it is by all means to be believed, because it is absurd."

On the other hand, some deny Tertullian's fideistic character, the statement "Credo quia absurdum" ("I believe because it is absurd") is sometimes cited as an example of views of the Church Fathers, but this has been argued to have been  a misquotation of Tertullian, saying that Tertullian was critiquing intellectual arrogance and the misuse of philosophy, but that he remained committed to reason and its usefulness in defending the faith.

William of Ockham 

Ockham was a fideist, holding that belief in God is only a matter of faith and not from knowledge, this led him to deny all the alleged proofs of God.

Luther 
Martin Luther taught that faith informs the Christian's use of reason. Regarding the mysteries of Christian faith, he wrote, "All the articles of our Christian faith, which God has revealed to us in His Word, are in presence of reason sheerly impossible, absurd, and false." And "Reason is the greatest enemy that faith has." However, Luther conceded that, grounded upon faith in Christ, reason can be used in its proper realm, as he wrote, "Before faith and the knowledge of God reason is darkness in divine matters, but through faith it is turned into a light in the believer and serves piety as an excellent instrument. For just as all natural endowments serve to further impiety in the godless, so they serve to further salvation in the godly. An eloquent tongue promotes faith; reason makes speech clear, and everything helps faith forward. Reason receives life from faith; it is killed by it and brought back to life."

Blaise Pascal and fideism 

Another form of fideism is assumed by Pascal's Wager, which is a rational argument for a pragmatic view of God's existence. Blaise Pascal invites the atheist considering faith to see faith in God as a cost-free choice that carries a potential reward. He does not attempt to argue that God indeed exists, only that it might be valuable to assume that it is true. Of course, the problem with Pascal's Wager is that it does not restrict itself to a specific god, although Pascal did have in mind the Christian version (referred to both by Jews and Christians as God), as is mentioned in the following quote. In his Pensées, Pascal writes:

Pascal, moreover, contests the various proposed proofs of the existence of God as irrelevant. Even if the proofs were valid, the beings they propose to demonstrate are not congruent with the deity worshiped by historical faiths, and can easily lead to deism instead of revealed religion: "The God of Abraham, Isaac, and Jacob—not the god of the philosophers!"

Hamann and fideism 
Considered to be the father of modern antirationalism, Johann Georg Hamann promoted a view that elevated faith alone as the only guide to human conduct. Using the work of David Hume he argued that everything people do is ultimately based on faith. Without faith (for it can never be proven) in the existence of an external world, human affairs could not continue; therefore, he argued, all reasoning comes from this faith: it is fundamental to the human condition. Thus all attempts to base belief in God using reason are in vain. He attacks systems like Spinozism that try to confine what he feels is the infinite majesty of God into a finite human creation.

Kant's qualified fideism
Hamann was a good personal friend of Immanuel Kant, one of the most influential philosophers of the modern era. While Kant and Hamann vociferously disagreed about both the use of reason and the scientific method, there were also a number of important points of agreement between them. For instance, one of the core views defended in Kant's Critique of Pure Reason is that reason is incapable of attaining knowledge of the existence of God or the immortality of the soul, a point which Hamann would agree with. The most important difference on this point is that Kant did not think that this gave way to antirationalism, whereas Hamann did. As a result, a qualified form of fideism is sometimes attributed to Kant. This modified form of fideism is also evident in his famous suggestion that we must "deny knowledge in order to make room for faith".

Kierkegaard
Natural theologians may argue that Kierkegaard was a fideist of this general sort: the argument that God's existence cannot be certainly known, and that the decision to accept faith is neither founded on, nor needs, rational justification, may be found in the writings of Søren Kierkegaard and his followers in Christian existentialism. Many of Kierkegaard's works, including Fear and Trembling, are under pseudonyms; they may represent the work of fictional authors whose views correspond to hypothetical positions, not necessarily those held by Kierkegaard himself.

In Fear and Trembling, Kierkegaard focused on Abraham's willingness to sacrifice Isaac. The New Testament apostles repeatedly argued that Abraham's act was an admirable display of faith. To the eyes of a non-believer, however, it must necessarily have appeared to be an unjustifiable attempted murder, perhaps the fruit of an insane delusion. Kierkegaard used this example to focus attention on the problem of faith in general. He ultimately affirmed that to believe in the incarnation of Christ, in God made flesh, was to believe in the "absolute paradox", since it implies that an eternal, perfect being would become a simple human. Reason cannot possibly comprehend such a phenomenon; therefore, one can only believe in it by taking a "leap of faith".

James and "will to believe"

American pragmatic philosopher and psychologist William James introduced his concept of the "will to believe" in 1896. Following upon his earlier theories of truth, James argued that some religious questions can only be answered by believing in the first place: one cannot know if religious doctrines are true without seeing if they work, but they cannot be said to work unless one believes them in the first place.

William James published many works on the subject of religious experience. His four key characteristics of religious experience are: 'passivity', 'ineffability', 'a noetic quality', and 'transiency'. Due to the fact that religious experience is fundamentally ineffable, it is impossible to hold a coherent discussion of it using public language. This means that religious belief cannot be discussed effectively, and so reason does not affect faith. Instead, faith is found through experience of the spiritual, and so understanding of belief is only gained through the practice of it.

Wittgenstein and fideism 
The philosopher Ludwig Wittgenstein did not write systematically about religion, though he did lecture on the topic. Some of his students' notes have been collected and published. On the other hand, it has been asserted that religion as a "form of life" is something that intrigued Wittgenstein to a great degree. In his 1967 article, entitled "Wittgensteinian Fideism", Kai Nielsen argues that certain aspects of Wittgenstein's thought have been interpreted by Wittgensteinians in a "fideistic" manner. According to this position, religion is a self-contained—and primarily expressive—enterprise, governed by its own internal logic or "grammar". This view—commonly called Wittgensteinian fideism—states:  that religion is logically cut off from other aspects of life;  that religious concepts and discourse are essentially self-referential; and  that religion cannot be criticized from an external (i.e., non-religious) point of view. Although there are other aspects that are often associated with the phenomena of Wittgensteinian fideism, Kai Nielsen has argued that such interpretations are implausible misrepresentations of the position. It is worth noting, however, that no self-proclaimed Wittgensteinian actually takes Nielsen's analysis to be at all representative of either Wittgenstein's view, or their own. This is especially true of the best-known Wittgensteinian philosopher of religion, D. Z. Phillips, who is also the best-known "Wittgensteinan fideist". In their book Wittgensteinian Fideism? (SCM Press, 2005), D. Z. Phillips and Kai Nielsen debate the status of Wittgensteinian fideism. Both agree that the position "collapses", though they think it fails for different reasons. For Nielsen, the position is socially and politically irresponsible since it ignores prudential, practical, and pragmatic considerations as a basis for criticizing different language games. For Phillips, the position fails because it is not Wittgensteinian, and thus is a caricature of his position. Amongst other charges, Nielsen argues most forcefully in an article entitled "On Obstacles of the Will" that Phillips' Wittgensteinian view is relevantly fideistic and that it, therefore, fails on the grounds that it cannot account for the possibility of external, cultural criticism. Phillips, in turn, in the last article in the book, entitled "Wittgenstein: Contemplation and Cultural Criticism", argues that the position is not Wittgensteinian at all, and that Wittgenstein's considered view not only allows for the possibility of external, cultural criticism, but also "advances" philosophical discussion concerning it.

Shestov 
Lev Shestov is associated with radical fideism, holding that religious truth can only be gained by rejecting reason.

Fideism and presuppositional apologetics 
Presuppositional apologetics is a Christian system of apologetics associated mainly with Calvinist Protestantism; it attempts to distinguish itself from fideism. It holds that all human thought must begin with the proposition that the revelation contained in the Bible is axiomatic, rather than transcendentally necessary, else one would not be able to make sense of any human experience (see also epistemic foundationalism). To non-believers who reject the notion that the truth about God, the world, and themselves can be found within the Bible, the presuppositional apologist attempts to demonstrate the incoherence of the epistemic foundations of the logical alternative by the use of what has come to be known as the "transcendental argument for God's existence" (TAG). On the other hand, some presuppositional apologists, such as Cornelius Van Til, believe that such a condition of true unbelief is impossible, claiming that all people actually believe in God (even if only on a subconscious level), whether they admit or deny it.

Presuppositional apologetics could be seen as being more closely allied with foundationalism than fideism, though it has sometimes been critical of both.

Criticism

Fideism rejected by the Catholic Church 
Catholic doctrine rejects fideism. The Catechism of the Catholic Church, representing Catholicism's great regard for Thomism, affirms that it is a Catholic doctrine that God's existence can indeed be demonstrated by reason. Aquinas' position, which is to be distinguished from rationalism, has deep roots in Western Christianity; it goes back to Anselm of Canterbury's observation that the role of reason was to explain faith more fully: fides quaerens intellectum, "faith seeking understanding", is his formula.

The official position of the Catholic Church is that while the existence of the one God can in fact be demonstrated by reason, nevertheless on account of the distortion of human nature caused by the first sin, humans can be deluded to deny the claims of reason that demonstrate God's existence. The Anti-Modernist oath promulgated by Pope Pius X required Catholics to affirm that:

Similarly, the Catechism of the Catholic Church teaches that:

Pope John Paul II's encyclical Fides et Ratio also affirms that God's existence is in fact demonstrable by reason, and that attempts to reason otherwise are the results of sin. In the encyclical, John Paul II warned against "a resurgence of fideism, which fails to recognize the importance of rational knowledge and philosophical discourse for the understanding of faith, indeed for the very possibility of belief in God".

Fideist currents in Catholic thought 

Historically, there have been a number of fideist strains within the Catholic orbit. Traditionalism, exemplified in the nineteenth century by Joseph de Maistre, emphasized faith in tradition as the means of divine revelation. The claims of reason are multiple, and various people have argued rationally for several contradictory things: in this environment, the safest course is to hold true to the faith that has been preserved through tradition, and to resolve to accept what the Church has historically taught. In his essay Du pape ("On the Pope"), de Maistre argued that it was historically inevitable that all of the Protestant churches would eventually seek reunification and refuge in the Catholic Church: science was the greater threat, it threatened all religious faith, and "no religion can resist science, except one".

Another refuge of fideist thinking within the Catholic Church is the concept of "signs of contradiction". According to this belief, the holiness of certain people and institutions is confirmed by the fact that other people contest their claims: this opposition is held to be worthy of comparison to the opposition met by Jesus Christ himself. This opposition and contradiction does not inherently prove something is true in Catholic thought, but only acts an additional possible indication of its truth. The idea of the sign of contradiction is related to the conviction that, while human reason is still operative, the distortion of fallen human nature causes concrete instances of reasoning to grope and often to go astray.

As sin 
Fideism has received criticism from theologians who argue that fideism is not a proper way to worship God. According to this position, if one does not attempt to understand what one believes, one is not really believing. "Blind faith" is not true faith. Notable articulations of this position include:
 Peter Abelard – Sic et Non
 Lord Herbert – De Veritate

As relativism 
Some critics argue that fideism can lead to relativism. The existence of other religions puts a fundamental question to fideists—if faith is the only way to know the truth of God, how are we to know which God to have faith in? Fideism alone is not considered an adequate guide to distinguish true or morally valuable revelations from false ones. An apparent consequence of fideism is that all religious thinking becomes equal. The major monotheistic religions become on par with obscure fringe religions, as neither can be advocated or disputed.

A case for reason 

Some critics note that people successfully use reason in their daily lives to solve problems and that reason has led to progressive increase of knowledge in the sphere of science. This gives credibility to reason and argumentative thinking as a proper method for seeking truth. Galileo Galilei, for example, said that "I do not feel obliged to believe that the same God who has endowed us with sense, reason and intellect has intended us to forgo their use."

On the other hand, according to these critics, there is no evidence that a religious faith that rejects reason would also serve us while seeking truth.

See also 
 Agnostic theism
 Apophatic theology
 Christian existential apologetics
 Christian existentialism
 Existence of God
 Liberal Christianity (contrast)
 Rational fideism
 Religious epistemology
 Scholasticism (contrast)
 Sola fide, the Protestant belief that Christians are saved by faith in Christ alone

References

Bibliography
 .
 .
 .

External links 
 Benjamin Brown, "The Comeback of "Simple Faith": The Ultra-Orthodox Concept of Faith and Its Development in the Nineteenth Century", Studies in Judaism, Humanities and the Social Sciences, 2017.
 .
 .

Epistemological theories
Epistemology of religion
Philosophy of religion
Theism
William James
Faith
Criticism of rationalism